Me-Åkernes or Midtre Åkernes is a deserted fjord farm on the slopes of  mountain along the northern shore of the Sunnylvsfjorden (an inner branch fjord of the Storfjorden) in Stranda Municipality in Møre og Romsdal county, Norway. The farm is located in the West Norwegian Fjords Norwegian World Heritage Sites and has been preserved both for its unique geologic siting and as a representative of typical Norwegian farm culture in the fjord regions. This geologically unique farm has also been identified as the model for the farm place appearing in Henrik Ibsen’s play Brand based on the similarity in the description and his visit there on 16 July 1862:
And here it stands without a fear
Because the glacier passes here
Just when the time of leave sprouts comes
Above the heads like boulder storms
The parsonage protected stands, like in a cascade cave.

The name
The farm Åkernes is first mentioned in 1603 ("Ackernes"), but it is probably from the Middle Ages. The Norse form must have been Akrnes, a compound of akr ('field; acre') and nes 'headland'. The farm was later divided into three parts: indre ('innermost'), ytre ('outermost') and midtre ('middle'). The form me is a form of what in modern standard language is midtre - and the meaning of Me-Åkernes is 'the middle one of the Åkernes farms'.

Location and access
Thus the five farm buildings are built against the rock face of a protected overhanging cliff face in the hillside, and the roofs are level with the slope, such that avalanches pass over the buildings without harming them. The only access is from the Storfjorden waters below; access from the ridge above is extremely difficult.

There is no natural harbour on the shore, just a small man-made landing place and some remaining stone walls that are remnants of an earlier boat shed. The boats were dragged onto dry land for safekeeping from the seas from the fjord.

Buildings and operation
The main house is where it is least exposed to avalanches. The Me-Åkernes farm is, except for the unusual adaptation to the terrain and accommodation for danger from avalanches, a typical multi-activity farm representative of the fjord and mountain farms of the Sunnmøre district. The farms had to base their economy on agriculture, fishing and hunting.

Me-Åkernes was originally a single farm, but in 1881 its fields were divided in halves between two related couples. The house and farm buildings were shared in common, but each couple maintained their own livestock.  There could be as many as 12–14 people living simultaneously at the farm. Each family would support livestock of four cattle and 40 sheep by supplementing fodder in the winter season by use of seaweed. The seaweed was treated in warm water, minced, and barley flour added. Although more recently they grew potatoes and barley, a field area named "Rugåkeren" (the Rye Field) indicates that rye was grown there in earlier times. To thresh the grain they used a manual threshing machine.

Today, the farm is private property, but the preservation society "Storfjordens venner" (The Friends of The Great Fjord) have maintained the buildings.  The last residents farming the land were Anders and Solveig Hanson Ringdal. They moved away from the farm on 6 December 1958.

Risk of landslide
Today the farm is, due to its location by the Åkernesrenna (the Åkernes crevice), at considerable risk. The Åkernesrenna has in recent years widened at an accelerating rate, and analyses show the threat of a coming landslide, estimated at 50 million cubic metres (65 million cubic yards with latest estimates of up to 100 million cubic metres or 130 million cubic yards).

Pictures

In popular culture 
Released in August 2015, The Wave (Bølgen) is a Norwegian disaster movie based on the premise of a rock slide from the mountain Åkerneset inundating the town of Geiranger.

References

External links 
 Åkernesrenna, Giant landslide in Storfjorden — Article and video 
 Giant landslide threatening rural districts 
 World Heritage List

Historic farms in Norway
Farms in Møre og Romsdal
Stranda
Former populated places in Møre og Romsdal